Vatra is an association of Albanian Americans, created in 1912, that has historically protected the rights of the Albanians in the United States, as well as has endeavored in lobbying with the United States Congress about the rights of the Albanians throughout the world.

Foundation
The first meeting to bring together all the Albanian American organizations into one federation took place on December 24, 1911, in Boston. This meeting was called with the initiative of the "Besa-Besën" association. In these meetings were present: Faik Konica, Fan Noli, Kristo Floqi, Marko Adams, and Paskal Aleksi. The meetings continued until 28 April 1912, when Vatra was officially founded. The official records of the unity commission cites: "We call as formed the Pan Albanian Federation of America by the following associations: "Besa-Besë", "Flamuri i Krujës-Kruja Flag", "Shoqërisë Kombëtare-National Association", "Mirëbërësja", and "Skënderbeut". "Dallandyshja" and "Malli i Mëmëdheut" were not present but conformed with the proceedings. In this historic meeting, a temporary board is named and its members are: Secretary - Fan Noli, Treasurer -  Llambi Chikozi,  "Dielli" Manager - Kristo Kirka, Federation Branch Managers: Faik Konica and Kristo Floqi. "Dielli" Newspaper Supervisors: Paskal Aleksi, Elia Tromara and Kosta Vasili.

Vatra was recognized by the Massachusetts state and received its certificate on June 13, 1912. The original certificate shows these names: Faik Koniça, Lambi Chikozi, Fan S. Noli, Kristo Floqi, Elia Tromara, Naum Cere, and Kosta Kotta.
Prominent following members who would join later would be Constantin Anastas Chekrezi, and Pani brothers from Dardhë.

World War I and the Peace Conference
Considering the political vacuum in Albania during the World War I, Vatra somehow functioned and was considered a kind of Albanian government in-exile. Vatra sent Noli and Konica in Europe to advocate and defend Albanian national demands. They remained in Europe until the war ended. Meanwhile, Kol Tromara became acting-chairman and main figure. During these turbulent years, VATRA gained influence and "Dielli" newspaper was published daily under Constantin Anastas Chekrezi's supervision. Vatra would perform a lobbying campaign during the Paris Peace Conference, 1919 trying to influence mostly the decision of the American delegation. Christo Dako would join the Albanian delegation in 1919. Meanwhile, Mihal Turtulli and Mehmed Konica would be very active in negotiating with Italians regarding the creation of an Albanian Privision Government and preparing the Congress of Durrës in 1918.
Vatra held a fundraising convention on December 29, 1918 led by Anastas Pandele, with the goal of supporting the Albanian delegation at the Peace Conference. Albanian emigrants throughout US raised a sum of $150,000 of which the greatest part was sent to Vatra's delegates to Paris.

New Albanian state and afterwards
Vatra would build the foundation of the new Orthodox Autocephalous Church of Albania, which would thrive independence from the Church of Constantinople and repel further Greek influence towards Albanian orthodox population.
Core members like Fan Noli and Faik Konica, would be involved in politics and administration of the newly created Albanian state, with Fan Noli leading the unsuccessful June Revolution. Noli would resume its position after returning in US. Agim Karagjozi would take over after Noli's death. 
The headquarters would move from Boston, MA, to Bronx, NY, in the 90s. Today, Vatra's influence is very minimal and mostly symbolic, while there are controversies regarding the political affiliations of today's organization.

Legacy
Vatra is unified with the Albanian American history. Its contribution to Albanian national cause, and state building has made Vatra the symbol of Albanian Nationalism and patriotism.

Publications
Vatra has published historically two magazines, Dielli, and The Adriatic Review. "Dielli" is still being published today, after a period of interruption.

References

http://illyriapress.com/pse-une-e-perkrah-komisionin-e-5-tetorit-2019-te-vatres/
http://illyriapress.com/komisioni-i-5-tetorit-shkelje-te-renda-ne-federaten-vatra-te-largohet-kryetari/

External links
Official website
Official social media website
Official 10-5-2019 VATRA Committee website

Albanian-American culture in New York (state)
Albanian-American history
1912 establishments in the United States
Diaspora organizations in the United States
Organizations established in 1912